The 24th parallel north is a circle of latitude that is 24 degrees north of the Earth's equatorial plane, about  north of the Tropic of Cancer. It is the line which demarcates boundary between Pakistan and India in the general area of Rann of Kutch. It also crosses Africa, Asia, the Indian Ocean, the Pacific Ocean, North America and the Atlantic Ocean.

At this latitude the sun is visible for 13 hours, 37 minutes during the summer solstice and 10 hours, 39 minutes during the winter solstice.

Around the world
Starting at the Prime Meridian and heading eastwards, the parallel 24° north passes through:

{| class="wikitable plainrowheaders"
! scope="col" width="125" | Co-ordinates
! scope="col" | Country, territory or sea
! scope="col" | Notes
|-
| 
! scope="row" | Algeria
|
|-
| 
! scope="row" | Libya
|
|-
| 
! scope="row" | Egypt
|
|-
| style="background:#b0e0e6;" | 
! scope="row" style="background:#b0e0e6;" | Red Sea
| style="background:#b0e0e6;" |
|-
| 
! scope="row" | Saudi Arabia
| Yanbu, Al Madinah Region Riyadh Region Eastern Region
|-
| 
! scope="row" | United Arab Emirates
| Emirate of Abu Dhabi - for about 
|-
| style="background:#b0e0e6;" | 
! scope="row" style="background:#b0e0e6;" | Persian Gulf
| style="background:#b0e0e6;" |
|-
| 
! scope="row" | United Arab Emirates
| Emirate of Abu Dhabi
|-
| 
! scope="row" | Oman
|
|-
| style="background:#b0e0e6;" | 
! scope="row" style="background:#b0e0e6;" | Indian Ocean
| style="background:#b0e0e6;" | Arabian Sea
|-
| 
! scope="row" | Pakistan
| Sindh
|-valign="top"
| 
! scope="row" | India
| Gujarat - for about  Rajasthan - for about  Madhya Pradesh Uttar Pradesh Chhattisgarh Jharkhand West Bengal
|-
| 
! scope="row" | Bangladesh
| For about 
|-
| 
! scope="row" | India
| West Bengal - for about 
|-
| 
! scope="row" | Bangladesh
|
|-valign="top"
| 
! scope="row" |India
| Tripura Mizoram
|-
| 
! scope="row" | Myanmar (Burma)
| For about 
|-
| 
! scope="row" | India
| Manipur - for about 
|-
| 
! scope="row" | Myanmar
| For about 
|-
| 
! scope="row" | India
| Manipur
|-
| 
! scope="row" | Myanmar
|
|-
| 
! scope="row" | People's Republic of China
| Yunnan, for about 
|-
| 
! scope="row" | Myanmar
|
|-
| 
! scope="row" | People's Republic of China
| Yunnan, Guangxi, Guangdong, and Fujian
|-
| style="background:#b0e0e6;" | 
! scope="row" style="background:#b0e0e6;" | South China Sea
| style="background:#b0e0e6;" | Taiwan Strait
|-
| 
! scope="row" | (Taiwan)
| Passing through Changhua,Nantou,Central Mountain Range, and Hualien
| 
|-valign="top"
| style="background:#b0e0e6;" | 
! scope="row" style="background:#b0e0e6;" | Pacific Ocean
| style="background:#b0e0e6;" | Passing just south of Hateruma island, Japan Passing just south of South Iwo Jima island, Japan Passing just north of Tern Island, Hawaii, United States
|-
| 
! scope="row" | Mexico
| Baja California peninsula
|-
| style="background:#b0e0e6;" | 
! scope="row" style="background:#b0e0e6;" | Gulf of California
| style="background:#b0e0e6;" | 
|-
| 
! scope="row" | Mexico
| Passing through Durango
|-
| style="background:#b0e0e6;" | 
! scope="row" style="background:#b0e0e6;" | Gulf of Mexico
| style="background:#b0e0e6;" |
|-
| 
! scope="row" | The Bahamas
| Cay Sal Bank atoll
|-
| style="background:#b0e0e6;" | 
! scope="row" style="background:#b0e0e6;" | Atlantic Ocean
| style="background:#b0e0e6;" |
|-
| 
! scope="row" | The Bahamas
| Andros island
|-
| style="background:#b0e0e6;" | 
! scope="row" style="background:#b0e0e6;" | Atlantic Ocean
| style="background:#b0e0e6;" |
|-
| 
! scope="row" | The Bahamas
| Exuma cays
|-valign="top"
| style="background:#b0e0e6;" | 
! scope="row" style="background:#b0e0e6;" | Atlantic Ocean
| style="background:#b0e0e6;" | Passing just south of Cat Island, Bahamas Passing just north of Conception Island, Bahamas
|-
| 
! scope="row" | The Bahamas
| San Salvador Island
|-
| style="background:#b0e0e6;" | 
! scope="row" style="background:#b0e0e6;" | Atlantic Ocean
| style="background:#b0e0e6;" |
|-
| 
! scope="row" | Western Sahara
| Claimed by Morocco
|-
| 
! scope="row" | Mauritania
|
|-
| 
! scope="row" | Mali
|
|-
| 
! scope="row" | Algeria
|
|}

See also
23rd parallel north
Tropic of Cancer
25th parallel north

References

n24
India–Myanmar border